Kundalatha (or Kundalata) is a novel by Appu Nedungadi, published in 1887. It is considered to be the first Malayalam novel.

See also

 Indulekha

External links
 Novel and Short Story to the Present Day - by M T Vasudevan Nair
 First Malayalam Novel

1887 novels
Malayalam novels
Novels set in India
19th-century Indian novels